The Columbus Hatchett House is a historic house at the northern corner of Main and Hazel Streets in Leslie, Arkansas.  It is a large two-story structure, fashioned out of rusticated concrete blocks.  It has vernacular Colonial Revival details, including egg-and-dart moldings above the window lintels, concrete quoining, Tuscan columns supporting the porch, and ornate Palladian windows.  it was built in c. 1910 by Columbus Hatchett using locally fabricated concrete blocks, and is one of the community's finest examples of Colonial Revival architecture.

The house was listed on the National Register of Historic Places in 1993.

See also
National Register of Historic Places listings in Searcy County, Arkansas

References

Houses on the National Register of Historic Places in Arkansas
Colonial Revival architecture in Arkansas
Houses in Searcy County, Arkansas
National Register of Historic Places in Searcy County, Arkansas